Elections to Omagh District Council were held on 21 May 1997 on the same day as the other Northern Irish local government elections. The election used three district electoral areas to elect a total of 21 councillors.

Election results

Note: "Votes" are the first preference votes.

Districts summary

|- class="unsortable" align="centre"
!rowspan=2 align="left"|Ward
! % 
!Cllrs
! % 
!Cllrs
! %
!Cllrs
! %
!Cllrs
! % 
!Cllrs
! %
!Cllrs
! % 
!Cllrs
!rowspan=2|TotalCllrs
|- class="unsortable" align="center"
!colspan=2 bgcolor="" | Sinn Féin
!colspan=2 bgcolor="" | SDLP
!colspan=2 bgcolor="" | UUP
!colspan=2 bgcolor="" | DUP
!colspan=2 bgcolor="" | Alliance
!colspan=2 bgcolor="" | Labour
!colspan=2 bgcolor="white"| Others
|-
|align="left"|Mid Tyrone
|bgcolor="#008800"|47.1
|bgcolor="#008800"|3
|18.9
|2
|14.6
|1
|10.1
|1
|0.7
|0
|0.0
|0
|8.6
|0
|7
|-
|align="left"|Omagh Town
|20.0
|1
|bgcolor="#99FF66"|26.9
|bgcolor="#99FF66"|2
|16.2
|1
|20.3
|1
|7.2
|1
|8.8
|1
|0.6
|0
|7
|-
|align="left"|West Tyrone
|24.3
|2
|24.7
|2
|bgcolor="40BFF5"|25.8
|bgcolor="40BFF5"|2
|14.6
|1
|2.8
|0
|1.8
|0
|6.0
|0
|7
|-
|- class="unsortable" class="sortbottom" style="background:#C9C9C9"
|align="left"| Total
|31.4
|6
|23.2
|6
|18.9
|4
|14.6
|3
|3.3
|1
|3.2
|1
|5.4
|0
|21
|-
|}

District results

Mid Tyrone

1993: 3 x Sinn Féin, 1 x SDLP, 1 x UUP, 1 x DUP, 1 x Independent Nationalist
1997: 3 x Sinn Féin, 2 x SDLP, 1 x UUP, 1 x DUP
1993-1997 Change: SDLP gain from Independent Nationalist

Omagh Town

1993: 2 x SDLP, 1 x DUP, 1 x Sinn Féin, 1 x UUP, 1 x Alliance, 1 x Labour Coalition
1997: 2 x SDLP, 1 x DUP, 1 x Sinn Féin, 1 x UUP, 1 x Alliance, 1 x Independent Labour
1993-1997 Change: Independent Labour joins Labour Coalition

West Tyrone

1993: 2 x UUP, 2 x SDLP, 2 x Sinn Féin, 1 x DUP
1997: 2 x UUP, 2 x SDLP, 2 x Sinn Féin, 1 x DUP
1993-1997 Change: No change

References

Omagh District Council elections
Omagh